The 2000–01 season saw Bristol City compete in the Football League Second Division where they finished in 9th position with 68 points.

Final league table

Results
Bristol City's score comes first

Legend

Football League Second Division

FA Cup

Football League Cup

Football League Trophy

Squad statistics

References

External links
 Bristol City 2000–01 at Soccerbase.com (select relevant season from dropdown list)

Bristol City F.C. seasons
Bristol City